Anna Gilbert may refer to:

Anna Gilbert (novelist), pseudonym of British writer Marguerite J. Gascoigne (1916–2004)
Anna Gilbert (musician) (born 1982), American singer/songwriter
Anna C. Gilbert (born 1972), American mathematician
Anna Gilbert (1812–1873), wife of Joseph Gilbert
Anna Gilbert, wife of Connecticut Governor James L. Howard (1818–1906)
Anna Gilbert, wife of Andrew Cowan
Anna Gilbert, actress in silent film Partners Again (1926)
Anna Gilbert, actress in British television series Whizziwig (1998–2000)

See also 
Anne Gilbert (disambiguation)